Keshia Thomas is an African-American woman known for a 1996 event at which she was photographed protecting a man believed to have been a Ku Klux Klan supporter. The resulting photograph, which was taken by Mark Brunner, has been considered to be iconic in nature and was named one of Life magazine's "Pictures of the Year" for 1996.

Rally
In June 1996 a branch of the Ku Klux Klan announced plans to hold a rally in Ann Arbor, Michigan. Several people in the Ann Arbor area planned to hold a protest against the Ku Klux Klan's presence on the day of the rally. Thomas was one of several people that attended and protested from an area that had been fenced and set aside for the protesters.

The protest proceeded until one protester announced over a megaphone that there was "a Klansman in the crowd". The unnamed man was a middle-aged white male wearing a T-shirt depicting the Confederate flag and an "SS tattoo". The man began to run but was knocked down, kicked, and beaten with placards.

Thomas, who was at that time 18 years old, shielded the man from the crowd and shouted for the attackers to stop and is credited as saying that you "can't beat goodness into a person". Shortly after that point the police arrived on the scene.

A news report stated that seven anti-Klansmen protesters were arrested at the event and a large group of protesters were tear gassed after they attempted to enter the police station where fifteen Klansmen were being kept for their safety.

Aftermath
After the rally Thomas was praised for her actions by Senator Ernest Hollings and a reporter for The Day commented that while the man was "wrong for the views he sanctioned", the protesters were also in the wrong "in their violence against him".

Thomas expressed that she had protected the man due to her own religious convictions and because she "knew what it was like to be hurt ... The many times that that happened, I wish someone would have stood up for me." A few months after the June event, Thomas was thanked by the son of the unnamed man she rescued.

References

Living people
People from Michigan

People notable for being the subject of a specific photograph
African-American people
Year of birth missing (living people)